Zuleyma Huidobro González (born 30 June 1978) is a Mexican politician affiliated with the Convergence. As of 2013 she served as Deputy of the LXII Legislature of the Mexican Congress representing Puebla.

References

1978 births
Living people
Politicians from Puebla
Women members of the Chamber of Deputies (Mexico)
Citizens' Movement (Mexico) politicians
21st-century Mexican politicians
21st-century Mexican women politicians
National Autonomous University of Mexico alumni
Deputies of the LXII Legislature of Mexico
Members of the Chamber of Deputies (Mexico) for Puebla